Borisav Pisić–Piske (31 January 1949 – 21 April 2015) was a Bosnian hurdler who competed in the 1980 Summer Olympics.

References

1949 births
2015 deaths
People from Zvornik
Serbian male hurdlers
Yugoslav male hurdlers
Olympic athletes of Yugoslavia
Athletes (track and field) at the 1980 Summer Olympics
Mediterranean Games gold medalists for Yugoslavia
Athletes (track and field) at the 1975 Mediterranean Games
Athletes (track and field) at the 1979 Mediterranean Games
Universiade medalists in athletics (track and field)
Mediterranean Games medalists in athletics
Universiade bronze medalists for Yugoslavia
Medalists at the 1975 Summer Universiade
Serbs of Bosnia and Herzegovina